Fabiola María de la Cuba Carrera (Peru, Lima, February 19, 1966) is a Peruvian singer.

She began as a member of Vecinos de Juan and in 1995 in the Creole group Los Hijos del Sol. In 1996 she began her solo career with the release of her first album related to waltzes. After obtaining recognition at the "Meeting with Peru" festival at the Cultural Center of the Catholic University, she represented Peru at the OTI festival in 1998.

Since then, she has been known as a cultural ambassador when she has toured nationally and internationally with other performers of the genre. In 2002 she presented "Fabiola...de suspiro y barro", which was attended by the National Symphony and Philharmonic Orchestra of Lima.

In 2014, her most successful tour, Todo el Perú, was launched, which was also toured in the Peruvian Amazon. She obtained the title of illustrious citizen of Nuevo Chimbote. She was also decorated with the gold medal in three stars and a diploma of honor, awarded by the Council of the Order of the National Union Prize of Peru, of the National Institute of Development and Social Action Peru.

In 2019, she performed her Tuttay Quilla show for the cultural schedule of the Pan American Games that year.

Controversies 
In 2009, she received funding from Congressman Luis Alva Castro for stage events, in which Congress sanctioned him by withdrawing his salary.

Discography 

 Dos extraños (1995)
 Otra vez el alma (2003)
 Ven a mi encuentro (2018)

Tours and shows 

 Fabiola...de suspiro y barro (2002)
 Todo el Perú (2014)
 Munay: la voluntad de amar (2016)
 Tuttay Quilla (2019-2020)
 Moliendas de sueños (2021)

References 

1966 births
Living people
People from Lima
Peruvian composers
Latin pop singers
Peruvian singers
Peruvian women